Tata 1mg, previously 1mg, is a healthcare platform based in Gurugram, India. It provides services, including e-pharmacy, diagnostics, e-consultation and health content. It was founded in April 2015 by Prashant Tandon, Gaurav Agarwal and Vikas Chauhan.

History 
In 2012, BLPL (Bright Lifecare Private Limited) started a digital health platform called HealthkartPlus. In 2015, Healthkart Plus separated from BLPL to form 1MG Technologies Private Limited. Healthkart continued as a platform for fitness and health products, 1mg was a generic drug search business.  The primary goal of 1mg is to make healthcare accessible and economical. The Gurugram based digital health startup maintains an online medicine database with information on side effects; generic substitutes, and provides home delivery services for pharmacy, FMCG and lab tests. In June 2021, Tata Digital Ltd, acquired 55% stake in 1mg to form Tata 1mg.

Also Read 
 MedPlus
 Online pharmacy laws in India
 Amazon Pharmacy
 Medlife
 Flipkart Health+

References 

Online companies of India
Online retailers of India
Indian companies established in 2015
Companies based in Gurgaon
Tata Group subsidiaries